Opioid food peptides include:

 Casomorphin (from milk)
 Gluten exorphin (from gluten)
 Gliadorphin/gluteomorphin (from gluten)
 Rubiscolin (from spinach)
 Soymorphin-5 (from soy)
 Oryzatensin (from rice)

Peptides
Opioids